William Yang (born 1943) is an acclaimed social history photographer, playwright, artist and filmmaker living in Australia. Born in Dimbulah, North Queensland he is a third generation Chinese Australian. Yang's photography and performances span over 50 years and document the uncharted growth and influence of Sydney's gay subculture from the 1970s through to the HIV/AIDS epidemic of the 1980s and 1990s and beyond. Through the media of photography and performance Yang also explores his own ethnicity as a Chinese Australian and the intersection of his ethnic background and sexuality.

Career 

Yang studied architecture at Queensland University where his interest in photography took shape. Photos of architectural detail, theatrical performance and people became the content that later defined his work, particularly performance and people.

Early career 
In the late 1960s Yang relocated from Brisbane to Sydney, abandoned architecture studies and joined an experimental theatre company, Performance Syndicate as a playwright. In the early 1970’s inspired by the Stonewall riots in New York, Yang came out as a gay man. Photography however became his metier rather than writing and actors were keen to include his photographic portraits in their portfolios. While celebrity and fashion fascinated Yang, photojournalism began to preoccupy his interest.

The direction of photojournalism led him to commissions with magazines hungry for images to fill their social pages.  Although this paid a living, Yang considered himself more an artist than a commercial photographer. At the same time photography was increasingly recognised as an artform, its significance reinforced in Sydney with the opening of the Australian Centre for Photography  (ACP) in November 1974. His first exhibition at ACP was in 1977, Sydneyphiles, consisting of celebrity social photos and (more controversial at the time) images of the gay community.

Yang became increasingly engrossed with documenting the gay subculture surrounding Oxford Street in Sydney and switched from earning a living with commercial magazines to earning commissions from the gay press . The trajectory of gay culture at this time was visibly exuberant: the Gay Mardi Gras  (later the Sydney Gay and Lesbian Mardi Gras) a hallmark of this self-assertion; the growing political activism around civil rights; and the ravages of the HIV/AIDS (human immunodeficiency virus/acquired immunodeficiency syndrome) epidemic were all captured by Yang.

Yang says of this time that there was an almost frenzied party milieu especially evident in the large RAT and Sleaze Balls that belied a sense of fatalism with the HIV/AIDS epidemic. Yang has said of this time:

I see myself as a photographic witness to our time. I feel compelled to perform these slide shows as social rituals to unburden myself of the things I have seen.

Mid career 
Documentation of the gay community brought into sharp focus his little explored ethnicity as a Chinese Australian. Embracing his Chinese ethnicity and heritage for the first time, Yang took lessons on Taoism, travelled to China and then eventually back to his home town of Dimbulah in North Queensland.  Such a full circle exposed Yang to the beauty and acceptance of the harsh Australian landscape entwined with recognition and pride in his Chinese heritage. The face of Buddha (1989), his first art performance, included slide projections and monologues with over-written photographic images and became the form of expression he preferred over pure photographic exhibitions. In over-writing his photographic images, Yang became increasingly aware of the importance of text in communicating  and personalising ideas, of placing himself within the story which could never be objective.

Inspired by the autobiographical monologues of Spalding Gray, Yang embarked on an international tour of his work Sadness, a ‘monologue with slide projections’, which was also developed as a film, winning several awards including the 1999 AWGIE Award for best screenplay and best documentary selected by the Australian Film Critics Circle Award. Increasingly known for documentaries including My Generation (2008 – stories of friends, sexuality and identity) Blood Links (1999 - stories about the Chinese in Australia including his family) and Friends of Dorothy (1998 – stories around the acceptance of sexuality, death and mourning) stemming from original performances, Grehan and Scheer contend that his performance pieces became a form of self-portraiture.

Later career 
In the last decade, Yang has worked closely with Contemporary Asian Australian Performance (CAAP) and in collaboration with Annette Shun Wa has been instrumental in supporting Asian Australian creatives including hip hop musicians Joal Ma and James Mangohig (In between two).

Works 

Sadness: A monologue with Slides – begins with Yang’s Chinese Australian heritage and is also an account of the slow death of Yang’s friends Nicolaas and Allan.  Its generation began when between 1988-1992, Yang realised that he had attended more wakes than parties.

There are two volumes of Yang's diaries which document his photographic work - Diaries: a retrospective exhibition: 25 years of social personal and landscape photography which is based on an exhibition curated by the State Library of NSW in 1998; and Sydney Diary 1974-1984 which is organised thematically with text by Yang.

A comprehensive bibliography and list of Yang's works can be found at AusLit

Legacy 
Yang’s archive consists of over half a million images covering almost 50 years of documenting people, places and social change.

Grehan and Scheer, discuss how Yang's work can be assessed in an age of digital self-regard or the 'selfie'. They suggest Yang's work resides in ‘memory…reflection and… (self) recognition’. Grehan and Scheer maintain that Yang’s work is an antidote to the instantaneous production of the 'selfie' and is a form of  'slow media' associated with documentarians. Although Yang also embraces digital media such as Facebook and microblogging, he still adheres to a sense of curation and narrative.  Yang  sees his digital storytelling as a podcasting.

Yang's chronicle of the HIV/AIDS epidemic in the 1980s and 1990s depicting images of close friends in the final stages of death is, according to Helen Ennis different from early nineteenth and twentieth century post mortem photography.  Ennis also contrasts his publicly exhibited work to more recent depictions of death and dying using digital technology held privately by surviving loved ones.  She maintains that his work was done at a time when the urgency surrounding the HIV/AIDS epidemic within a specific demographic was both personal and political:—

A retrospective exhibition at the Queensland Art Gallery in 2021 (Seeing and Being Seen) chronicles the portraits, the parties, the politics, the personal and the natural.

Awards 
 1993 Higashikawa-cho International Photographic Festival award of International Photographer of the Year
 1999 AWGIE Award
 1999 Australian Film Critics Circle Award

References

External links 
Portrait of an Artist: William Yang. James C. Sourris AM collection of artist interviews 2020-2021, State Library of Queensland.

1943 births
Living people
Australian photographers
Australian LGBT dramatists and playwrights
LGBT film people